Storyville was a British jazz magazine that ran from 1965 to 2003 featuring jazz history, discography, and record trading. It was published six times a year from October 1965 to December 1986 (issues 1 to 128), then quarterly from March 1987 to June 1995 (issues 129 to 162), then four  volumes were published until 2003.

History 
Storyville was founded by Laurie Wright (né Lawrence D. Wright; 1929–2010).  The publication has been acclaimed for containing a wealth of early historical material on jazz.  And although Storyville was not officially a peer-reviewed journal — in part because, other than music librarians, few jazz scholars existed in academic research in 1965 — it was, nonetheless, peer-reviewed in reality by well-informed jazz enthusiasts, discographers, musicologists, and the like.

Separately from the magazine, Storyville Publications published books about jazz, notably discographies. Included were Wright's own works, the standard discographies, two volumes of Eric Townley's Tell Your Story; A Dictionary of Jazz and Blues Recordings 1917–1950, Tom Lord's bio-discography, Clarence Williams (1976), and several biographical and autobiographical memoirs of historic musicians.  The last of these, published under Wright's name, was an autobiography, Trombone Man: Preston Jackson's Story (2005), after which ill-health forced Wright's retirement.

Archival access 
Digital

All issues are digitally reproduced and available on the website of the National Jazz Archive, a charitable organization based in Loughton, England, by permission of Lauri Wright's Estate.

 Storyville at the National Jazz Archives

Library codes

Covers 
 Covers

See also 
 Storyville Index: No. 1 to No. 162 (October 1965 through June 1995), compiled by Howard Rye (né Howard Willett Rye; born 1947) and P. J. S. Mitchell, revised and enlarged by Bernhard H. Behncke with additional references to artists, instruments, and locations, Hamburg, Germany (Summer 2002);

References 

1965 establishments in the United Kingdom
1995 disestablishments in the United Kingdom
Music magazines published in the United Kingdom
Monthly magazines published in the United Kingdom
Defunct magazines published in the United Kingdom
English-language magazines
Jazz magazines
Magazines established in 1965
Magazines disestablished in 1995
Music archives in the United Kingdom
Magazines published in London